Hafız Selman İzbeli was a Turkish militia member in the Turkish War of Independence and the first female councilwoman in Kastamonu.

She was one of the founders of the women's branch of the "Association for Defence of National Rights".

During the Turkish War of Independence
She gathered the women of Kastamonu, and made them knit socks, sweaters and flannel for the soldiers fighting in the Turkish War of Independence (1919–1923). She came from a wealthy family. When the soldiers came to Kastamonu, she met them all on the road and fed them all.

Founding of the Republic
She would always say "Ben Cumhuriyetçiyim" ("I'm a Republican"). After the war, she learned to read and write with the new alphabet, which was adopted in 1928. She was recommended to be a member of parliament, however, she declined because she would have to uncover her head and she did not want to take off her headscarf. When the founder of the Republic Mustafa Kemal came to Kastamonu, it is said that he visited İzbeli's home and that they drank coffee together.

References

Sources
 

People from Kastamonu
20th-century Turkish women
Turkish women activists
Women in the Turkish War of Independence
Turkish people of the Turkish War of Independence